The 1904–05 season was Burslem Port Vale's seventh consecutive season (11th overall) of football in the English Football League. A poor season, the club had to apply (successfully) for re-election. The club had to continue their policy of selling their best players to survive.

An extremely poor defence saw some embarrassing scorelines away from home, and the lack of a consistent goalscorer was also a cause for concern.

Overview

Second Division
A rather quiet pre-season saw no signings of note, however past player, outside-right Dick Evans re-signed from Southampton in September. This return was ended in his second game of the season – a Staffordshire Senior Cup defeat to Wolves – when he suffered a career-ending injury.

The first game of the season saw 5,000 turn up to witness a 2–2 draw with Manchester United, this positive start soon ended as despite going their first four games unbeaten, the club had to wait until their ninth match for their first victory. On 5 November 1904, the club's record 29 away games without a win streak came to an end with a 3–0 victory at Grimsby Town. The next match saw Liverpool win 2–1 thanks to a goal that never actually crossed the line – the referee had to leave the pitch under escort. Following the sale of key players in December, the form of the "Valeites" took a hit as from 4 December to the end of February they recorded just two victories – both against West Bromwich Albion. This run included heavy defeats at Manchester United and Burnley. In February the club's revival was helped by new signing Robert Carter, as six of the last seven home games were wins. Despite this they still suffered on their travels, taking an 8–1 hammering at Anfield.

The club finished in sixteenth place, though their 27 points saw them just one point off Blackpool, and six points off seventh place. Burton United and Doncaster Rovers both finished well below Vale, and at the end of the season both Vale and Burton were re-elected.

Dick Allman was top scorer with a pitiful eight goals, though scoring proved to be a team effort to give Vale a reasonable total of 47 league goals. However, in defensive terms the season was awful, their 72 conceded would always guarantee a battle against dropping into the lottery of the re-election zones.

Allman left for Reading at the season's end. Harry Croxton was an ever-present, and other regulars included goalkeeper Harry Cotton, and outfielders Sam Whittingham, Joseph Holyhead, George Price, and Adrian Capes. Manager Sam Gleaves stepped down at the end of the season, and was given the position of director, his replacement was former player Tommy Clare.

Finances
The financial outlook was as grim as ever, as directors were forced to sell Ernest Mullineux and Tom Simpson to Bury for £600 and £200 respectively. This gave the club a season profit of £140, and reduced club debt to just £33, however gate receipts had fallen by £150.

Cup competitions
The club came up against tough competition in both county cup competitions, losing 1–0 to Wolverhampton Wanderers in the First Round of the Staffordshire Senior Cup. They found rather more success in the Birmingham Senior Cup, where Vale defeated rivals Stoke with a Tom Simpson hat-trick at home, following a goalless draw at the Victoria Ground. This achievement was less significant due to a slight from Stoke, who only sent out their reserve side. Following this success the club lost in the semi-final to Second Division rivals West Bromwich Albion. The club yet again failed to qualify for the FA Cup, losing narrowly to Barnsley in the qualification stages.

League table

Results

Burslem Port Vale's score comes first

Football League Second Division

Results by matchday

Matches

FA Cup

Birmingham Senior Cup

Staffordshire Senior Cup

Player statistics

Appearances

Top scorers

Transfers

Transfers in

Transfers out

References
Specific

General

Port Vale F.C. seasons
Burslem Port Vale